Christopher Coleman George (born September 16, 1979) is a former Major League Baseball pitcher. He played most of his career with Kansas City Royals (2001–2004). He was a first round draft pick by the Royals in 1998.

From –, George pitched for the Florida Marlins Triple-A affiliate, the Albuquerque Isotopes. George signed with the Colorado Rockies on December 22, 2007, and was assigned to Triple-A Colorado Springs. He was released by the Rockies on June 17. Shortly after his release, George signed with the Toronto Blue Jays and was assigned to their Triple-A affiliate, the Syracuse Chiefs. He last played in 2012 with the Norfolk Tides.

References

External links

1979 births
Living people
Albuquerque Isotopes players
American expatriate baseball players in Mexico
Baseball players at the 2000 Summer Olympics
Baseball players from Houston
Colorado Springs Sky Sox players
Diablos Rojos del México players
Gulf Coast Royals players
Kansas City Royals players
Major League Baseball pitchers
Medalists at the 2000 Summer Olympics
Mexican League baseball pitchers
Norfolk Tides players
Olympic gold medalists for the United States in baseball
Omaha Golden Spikes players
Omaha Royals players
Pawtucket Red Sox players
Syracuse Chiefs players
Wichita Wranglers players
Wilmington Blue Rocks players
Klein High School alumni